Matthew Leek is a former Rugby Union player. He attended The John Fisher School in Croydon, Surrey.

He played for Saracens, London Wasps, and Leinster in Ireland. He also represented England.

References

Living people
Year of birth missing (living people)
English rugby union players
Rugby union players from Croydon